The first season of Drag Race Holland premiered on 18 September and concluded on 6 November 2020. The season was available for streaming on Videoland in the Netherlands and on WOW Presents Plus internationally. The season ran for eight episodes.

The ten Dutch drag queens competed for the title of the first Dutch drag superstar, a crown, scepter and necklace by Fierce Drag Jewels, a cover shoot for Cosmopolitan magazine and a hand-made dress by Claes Iversen, worth €18,000.

The cast was officially announced on September 7, 2020.

The winner of the first season of Drag Race Holland was Envy Peru, with Janey Jacké as runner-up.

Contestants

(Ages, names, and cities stated are at time of filming.)

Contestant progress

Lip syncs
Legend:

Guest judges
Listed in chronological order:

, fashion designer
, comedian
, singer
Nikkie de Jager, make-up artist, YouTuber
, actor
Amber Vineyard, choreographer
Carlo Boszhard, TV host
Ruth Jacott, singer
, TV host
Loiza Lamers, model, businesswoman
Edsilia Rombley, singer

Special guests
Guests who appeared in episodes, but did not judge on the main stage.

Episode 1
Jasper Suyk, photographer

Episode 2
Olga Commandeur, athlete

Episode 4
, drag queen

Episode 5
Rob Jacobs, photographer
, vlogger

Episode 6
Niek Marijnissen, participant in The Bachelorette

Episode 7 & 8
Gerald and Frank, choreographers

Episodes

References

2020 Dutch television seasons
2020 in LGBT history
Drag Race Holland seasons